Storax Sedan was a shallow underground nuclear test conducted in Area 10 of Yucca Flat at the Nevada National Security Site on July 6, 1962, as part of Operation Plowshare, a program to investigate the use of nuclear weapons for mining, cratering, and other civilian purposes. The radioactive fallout from the test contaminated more US residents than any other nuclear test. The Sedan Crater is the largest human-made crater in the United States and is listed on the National Register of Historic Places.

Effects

Sedan was a thermonuclear device with a fission yield less than 30% and a fusion yield about 70%. According to Carey Sublette, the design of the Sedan device was similar to that used in the Bluestone and Swanee tests of Operation Dominic conducted days and months prior to Sedan respectively, and was therefore not unlike the W56 high yield Minuteman I missile warhead.

The timing of the test put it within the Operation Storax fiscal year, but Sedan was functionally part of Operation Plowshare, and the test protocol was sponsored and conducted by Lawrence Livermore National Laboratory with minimal involvement by the United States Department of Defense. A circular area of the desert floor five miles across was obscured by fast-expanding dust clouds moving out horizontally from the base surge, akin to pyroclastic surge. The blast caused seismic waves equivalent to an earthquake of 4.75 on the Richter scale. The radiation level on the crater lip at 1 hour after burst was 500 R per hour (130 mC/(kg·h)), but it dropped to 500 mR per hour after 27 days.

Within 7 months (~210 days) of the excavation, the bottom of the crater could be safely walked upon with no protective clothing, with radiation levels at 35 mR per hour after 167 days.

Fallout

The explosion caused two plumes of radioactive cloud, rising to 3.0 km and 4.9 km (10,000 ft and 16,000 ft). The plumes headed northeast and then east in roughly parallel paths towards the Atlantic Ocean. Nuclear fallout was dropped through several counties. Detected radioactivity was especially high in eight counties in Iowa and one county each in Nebraska, South Dakota and Illinois. The most heavily affected counties were Howard, Mitchell and Worth counties in Iowa as well as Washabaugh County in South Dakota, an area that has since been incorporated into Jackson County and is within the Pine Ridge Indian Reservation. These four counties measured maximum levels higher than 6,000 microcuries per square meter (220 MBq/m2).

Of all the nuclear tests conducted in the United States, Sedan ranked highest in overall activity of radionuclides in fallout. The test released 880,000 curies (33 PBq) of radioactive iodine-131, an agent of thyroid disease, into the atmosphere. Sedan ranked first in percentages of these particular radionuclides detected in fallout: 198Au, 199Au, 7Be, 99Mo, 147Nd, 203Pb, 181W, 185W and 188W. Sedan ranked second in these radionuclides in fallout: 57Co, 60Co and 54Mn. Sedan ranked third in the detected amount of 24Na in fallout. In countrywide deposition of radionuclides, Sedan was highest in the amount of 7Be, 54Mn, 106Ru and 242Cm, and second highest in the amount of deposited 127mTe. While Sedan ranks highest in percentages of 198Au detected, it is not the most prolific generator or gold-heavy design that was tested by the US: due to the explosion being far more well contained, a larger quantity of gold, referred to as "a goldmine", was used extensively in the W71 warhead, that was proof-tested in 1971 within a deep borehole in the Amchitka islands off Alaska.

Sedan's fallout contamination contributed a little under 7% to the total amount of radiation which fell on the US population during all of the nuclear tests at NTS. Sedan's effects were similar to shot "George" of Operation Tumbler–Snapper, detonated on June 1, 1952, which also contributed about 7% to the total radioactive fallout. Uncertainty regarding exact amounts of exposure prevents knowing which of the two nuclear tests caused the most; George is listed as being the highest exposure and Sedan second highest by the United States Department of Health and Human Services, Centers for Disease Control and Prevention, and the National Cancer Institute.

Had this test been conducted after 1965 when improvements in device design were realized, achieving a 100-fold reduction in radiation release is considered feasible.

Conclusions
The Plowshare project developed the Sedan test in order to determine the feasibility of using nuclear detonations to quickly and economically excavate large amounts of earth and rock. Proposed applications included the creation of harbors, canals, open pit mines, railroad and highway cuts through mountainous terrain and the construction of dams. Assessment of the full effects of the Sedan shot showed that the radioactive fallout from such uses would be extensive. Public concerns about the health effects and a lack of political support eventually led to abandonment of the concept. No such nuclear excavation has since been undertaken by the United States, though the Soviet Union continued to pursue the concept through their program Nuclear Explosions for the National Economy, particularly with their 140 kiloton Chagan (nuclear test), which created an artificial lake reservoir (see Lake Chagan).

Diplomatic issue with Sudan
On March 2, 2005, Ellen Tauscher, a Democratic member of the U.S. House of Representatives from California, used Sedan as an example of a test which produced a considerable amount of radioactive fallout while giving congressional testimony on the containment of debris from nuclear testing. However, the name "Sedan" was incorrectly transcribed as "Sudan" in the Congressional Record.

Within days of the error, the international community took notice. Sudanese officials responded by stating that "the Sudanese government takes this issue seriously and with extreme importance". The Chinese Xinhua General News Service published an article claiming that the Sudanese government blamed the U.S. for raising cancer rates among the Sudanese people. Despite the U.S. embassy in Khartoum issuing a statement clarifying that it was a typographic error, Mustafa Osman Ismail, the Sudanese Foreign Minister, stated his government would continue investigating the claims.

See also
 Chagan (nuclear test)
 Peaceful nuclear explosion

References

External links

 US government movie about the Sedan test
 Virtual-Reality tour of Sedan Site
 Sedan Crater  at the Online Nevada Encyclopedia

Nevada Test Site nuclear explosive tests
Underground nuclear weapons testing
Diplomatic incidents
History of Nye County, Nevada
Peaceful nuclear explosions
1962 in military history
1962 in Nevada
1962 in the United States
Explosions in 1962
July 1962 events in the United States